Hanishi no Mimichi (土師水道, 土師氏御道 or 土師水通, also known by the courtesy name Hanishi no Shibimaro 土師乃志婢麿) was a Japanese nobleman and waka poet in the Nara period.

Biography 
The details of the life of the poet Hanishi no Mimichi are not well documented. Four poems in the famous waka anthology the Man'yōshū are attributed to him, with his name being written in various styles in the notes attached to these poems. His given name is written as 水道 ("water-road") in the attribution of poems 557 and 558 in Book IV, but at 御道 ("august-road") for 843 in Book V.

His kabane was Sukune.

His court position is not indicated in the collection, so he was likely of low rank.

In Tenpyō 2 (730) he participated in a plum blossom-viewing party at the residence of Ōtomo no Tabito, then the governor (一大宰帥 ichi Dazai no sochi) of the Dazaifu.

Poetry 
Poems 557, 558, 843 and 3844 in the Man'yōshū are attributed to him. The first pair of poems, included in Book V of the collection, were written on a sea voyage from his posting in Tsukushi to the capital, expressing his pining for his feeling of loneliness without his wife and his desire to see her as soon as possible. In his commentary on the poems,  noted the use of taboo language, apparently deliberately so, to emphasize the sincerity of the poet's emotions.

The last of Mimichi's poems in the collection's ordering (which is not strictly chronological across books), 3844, is of uncertain date. Akira Nakamura, in his article on Mimichi for the Man'yōshū Kajin Jiten dates the poem to Mimichi's later years after returning to the Capital, based on stylistic differences with the earlier poems quoted above.

See also 
 Reiwa

References

Citations

Works cited 

 
 
 
 

8th-century Japanese poets
Man'yō poets
Japanese male poets
Kuge